Hambirrao Mohite was the chief military commander in the army of the Maratha king Chhatrapati Shivaji Maharaj. An able military general, he executed several campaigns for Chhatrapari Shivaji Maharaj and later served under Chhatrapati Sambhaji Maharaj.

Early life 

Hambirrao was born in a Mohite-Chavhan Clan of 96 kuli Maratha to Sambhaji Mohite, a military chieftain. He grew up with 2 brothers. Harifrao, Shankarji and 2 sisters named Soyarabai and Annubai. Soyrabai later married Shivaji maharaj, which made Hambirrao Shivaji maharaj's brother-in-law.

After Prataprao Gujar's death, Shivaji maharaj made Hambirrao his Sarsenapati (commander).

Attack on Burhanpur 

Burhanpur was a major trade center connecting southern and northern India and had a total of 17 trade centers in the city. On 30 January 1681, Hambirrao Mohite and Sambhaji suddenly attacked Burhanpur. At that time the Subedar of Burhanpur was Jehan Khan. Only 200 soldiers were positioned in Burhanpur, while Hambirrao had an army of 20,000. The Mughals did not have the strength to oppose Hambirrao's army. Marathas got assets worth more than 1 crore hons in this battle.

On 17 March 1683, Hambirrao defeated Ranamast Khan, one of the most powerful chieftains of Aurangzeb, in a battle at Kalyan-Bhiwandi.

Death 

In 1687, in a battle fought near Wai province, Hambirrao defeated Rustum Khan, but a cannonball hit Hambirrao leading to his death.

In popular culture 
The film Sarsenapati Hambirrao is based on his life.

References

People of the Maratha Empire
1687 deaths